Intravaginal ejaculation latency time (IELT) is the time it takes to ejaculate during vaginal penetration. Average IELT varies between people and tends to decrease with age.

Some medications such as selective serotonin reuptake inhibitors (SSRIs) affect IELT. IELT is one factor used to diagnose and treat conditions such as premature ejaculation. IELT may be relevant in perceptions of sexual performance and actual satisfaction, which may also be dependent on many other factors.

Studies
Researchers have made conflicting discoveries about IELT. In a multinational study, the authors studied 491 men in the Netherlands, Spain, Turkey, UK, and US. The men were in stable heterosexual relationships. Over a four-week period, couples recorded IELT data using a stopwatch and noted condom use. Median IELT was independent of condom use. Median IELT decreased with age (18–30: 6.5 minutes, 31–50: 5.4 minutes, above 51: 4.3 minutes). Median IELT for all participants was 5.4 minutes. Median IELT varied significantly by individual with 14% of men under 3:20 and 26% of men over 10:00. Potential problems include total sample size, small sample size per country, too few observations for each participant, and psychological effects of using a stopwatch.

In 1991, scholars from the Kinsey Institute stated, "The truth is that the time between penetration and ejaculation varies not only from man to man, but from one time to the next for the same man." They added that the appropriate length for sexual intercourse is the length of time it takes for both partners to be mutually satisfied, emphasizing that Kinsey "found that 75 percent of men ejaculated within two minutes of penetration at least half of the time."  In their book Human Sexual Response, Masters and Johnson published a variety of findings on sexual response and satisfaction based on direct observation and medical exams. Sexual satisfaction is independent of how long intercourse lasts. A man's response time varies with a woman's menstrual cycle; shorter IELTs occur nearest to ovulation. Both partners' sexual experience also affects latency time.

A 2008 survey of Canadian and American sex therapists stated that the average time for heterosexual intercourse (coitus) was 7 minutes and that 1 to 2 minutes was too short, 3 to 7 minutes was adequate and 7 to 13 minutes desirable, while 13 to 30 minutes was too long.

Effect of substances
Numerous chemical substances influence the IELT. Substances such as alcohol and opioids (e.g. heroin, morphine, oxycodone) depress the central nervous system, prolonging the IELT, while selective serotonin reuptake inhibitors (SSRIs) (e.g. dapoxetine) delay ejaculation by blocking a physiological process connected to ejaculatory inevitability, "the male point of no return". For that reason, SSRIs can be prescribed to treat premature ejaculation.

See also
Delayed ejaculation
Human sexual response cycle
Orgasm
Premature ejaculation
Refractory period (sex)

References

Sexual health